The 2014 Belarusian Super Cup was held on 15 March 2014 between the 2013 Belarusian Premier League champions winners BATE Borisov and the 2012–13 Belarusian Cup winners Minsk. BATE won the match 1–0 and won the trophy for the fourth time.

Match details

See also
2013 Belarusian Premier League
2012–13 Belarusian Cup

References

Belarusian Super Cup
Super
Belarusian Super Cup 2014